Flora Jean "Flo" Hyman (July 31, 1954 – January 24, 1986) was an American athlete who played volleyball. She was an Olympic silver medalist and played professional volleyball in Japan.

Early life and education
Hyman was the second of eight children born to George W Hyman (5 July 1907- 13 July 1987) and Warrene Hyman (née Farrington, 4 February 1927-December 1976). As a child, Hyman was self-conscious about her rapid growth and the fact that she towered over her peers. In 1983 she recalled "When they were three foot tall, I was four foot tall. When they were four foot tall, I was five". Her nickname at school was "Jolly green giant", but her family and friends persuaded her to be proud of her height and to use it to her advantage. Flo's final adult height was just over 6 ft 5in (1.96 m). In January 1979, in an interview, Hyman said that she found the stares and questions about her height that she got from strangers irritating but she had learned to live with it.

When she was 12, and standing 6 ft 2in (1.88 m) tall, she began playing two-on-two tournaments on the beach, usually with her sister Suzanne as partner. In 1970, at the age of 16, Hyman started playing volleyball professionally. By the time Flo was a senior in high school, she had developed a lethal spike.

She graduated from Morningside High School in Inglewood, California and then attended El Camino College for one year before transferring to the University of Houston as that school's first female scholarship athlete. She spent three years there and led the Houston Cougars to two top-five national finishes, but did not complete her final year, instead focusing her attention on her volleyball career. Hyman said she would graduate once her volleyball career was over and that "You can go to school when you're 60. You're only young once, and you can only do this once".

While at Houston, she was the first ever winner of the Broderick Award (now the Honda Sports Award) as the nation's best female collegiate volleyball player in 1977.

Contribution to volleyball
"I had to learn to be honest with myself. I had to recognize my pain threshold. When I hit the floor, I have to realize it's not as if I broke a bone. Pushing yourself over the barrier is a habit. I know I can do it and try something else crazy. If you want to win the war, you've got to pay the price."

Hyman left Houston to play for the national team, based in Colorado. When Flo joined, the squad was sorely in need of leadership. Operating without a coach, it had a host of talented players with no one at the helm to guide them.

In 1975 the U.S. team floundered through qualifying rounds for the 1976 Olympic games and failed to make it. In 1977 the team finished fifth at the World Championships. Hyman and her teammates looked forward to qualifying for and playing in the 1980 Olympics, but their dreams were curtailed when the United States boycotted the Moscow games.

Hyman played in the 1981 World Cup and the 1982 World Championship, when the US won the bronze medal. A speciality of Hyman was the "Flying Clutchman", a fast, hard-impacting volleyball spike that travels at 110 mph (180 km/h). It was perfected under Dr. Gideon Ariel, a former 1960 and 1964 Israeli Olympic shot putter in Coto de Caza, California. At the 1984 Olympics, Hyman, by now both the tallest and oldest member of the team, led the US to the silver medal, beaten by China in the final. The United States had defeated them earlier in the tournament.

Death

After the Olympics, Hyman moved to Japan to play volleyball professionally, joining the Daiei women's squad in the Japan Volleyball League. She was so popular in Japan that she began a modeling and acting career there and was constantly in demand. She intended to return to the United States permanently in the Summer of 1986, but never got the chance to do so. On January 24, 1986, Hyman collapsed while sitting on the sidelines after being substituted out in a game against Hitachi in Matsue City. She told her team to keep fighting, then moments later slid to the floor. She was pronounced dead at 9:36 that evening.

At first, the cause of Hyman's death was stated to be a heart attack. Not fully accepting this finding, her family requested that an autopsy be performed in Culver City, California. The autopsy, which was held on January 30, dismissed the possibility of a heart attack. It found that Hyman had a very healthy heart, and instead it was determined that she had suffered from undiagnosed Marfan syndrome, which had caused a fatal aortic dissection. Apart from her height, nearsightedness, very long arms and large hands, she showed few other physical symptoms. The pathologist who performed the autopsy, Victor Rosen, said that Hyman physically had been in superb condition except for a single fatal flaw—a dime-sized  weak spot in her aorta. That small spot, less than an inch above her heart, had been there since her birth, and the artery had burst at that point as she sat on the sideline in Matsue. There was a three-week-old blood clot around the tear, indicating that an earlier rip in the same spot had already begun to heal when the fatal second rupture occurred.

Doctors later discovered Hyman's brother had Marfan syndrome as well, and he underwent an open heart surgery afterwards. Experts believed Hyman was lucky to have survived as long as she did, playing a physically demanding sport such as volleyball.

She was buried at Inglewood Park Cemetery, Inglewood, California, on January 31, 1986. Over 500 people attended the funeral service.

Achievements
 AIAW National Player of the Year, 1976.
First winner of the Honda Sports Award (at the time, the Broderick Award) in volleyball
 Three times All American
 World Cup Competition, top six players of 1981
 Best Hitter, World Cup Competition 1981
 Bronze medal, 1982 World Championship in Peru
 Silver medal, 1984 Summer Olympics
 Sports Illustrated November 29, 1999 #69, greatest woman athletes of the century
 The Flo Hyman Memorial Award is named in her honor.
 In 1985, Flo Hyman appeared in a film entitled Order of the Black Eagle, in which she portrayed a knife-wielding mercenary named Spike.
 The National Girls and Women in Sports Day (NGWSD) is celebrated throughout the US to remember and honor Flo Hyman. It was created and is supported by Girls Incorporated, Girl Scouts of the USA, the National Association for Girls and Women in Sport, the Women's Sports Foundation and the YWCA of the U.S.A.

References

External links
 Biography at Harvard.edu
 Biography at blackathlete.com
 
 
 

1954 births
1986 deaths
African-American volleyball players
American women's volleyball players
Volleyball players at the 1984 Summer Olympics
Olympic silver medalists for the United States in volleyball
People with Marfan syndrome
Deaths from aortic dissection
Burials at Inglewood Park Cemetery
Sport deaths in Japan
Houston Cougars women's volleyball players
Sportspeople from Inglewood, California
African-American sportswomen
Medalists at the 1984 Summer Olympics
20th-century African-American sportspeople
20th-century African-American women
20th-century American people
Pan American Games medalists in volleyball
Pan American Games silver medalists for the United States
Medalists at the 1983 Pan American Games